Sankt Andrä-Höch is a municipality in the district of Leibnitz in the Austrian state of Styria.

Geography
Sankt Andrä-Höch lies about 35 km south of Graz and about 15 km west of Leibnitz.

References

Cities and towns in Leibnitz District